The thirteenth season of The Real Housewives of New Jersey, an American reality television series, is broadcast on Bravo. It premiered on February 7, 2023, and is primarily filmed in New Jersey; its executive producers are Jordana Hochman, Sarah Howell, Mioshi Hill, Lauren Volonakis, Maggie Langtry, Lisa Levey and Andy Cohen.

The Real Housewives of New Jersey focuses on the lives of returning cast members Teresa Giudice, Melissa Gorga, Dolores Catania, Margaret Josephs, and Jennifer Aydin. Danielle Cabral and Rachel Fuda join the cast, with Jackie Goldschneider and Jennifer Fessler joining the cast as Friends of the Housewives.

Production and crew
Jordana Hochman, Sarah Howell, Mioshi Hill, Lauren Volonakis, Maggie Langtry, Lisa Levey and Andy Cohen are recognized as the series' executive producers; it is produced and distributed by Sirens Media.

Cast and synopsis
Giudice, Gorga, Catania, Josephs and Aydin returned, with Goldschneider returning in a recurring capacity. Danielle Cabral and Rachel Fuda join the cast, with Jennifer Fessler joining as a Friend of the Housewives. Former "Friend of the housewives" Traci Johnson appears in a guest capacity.

Episodes

References

External links

2023 American television seasons
New Jersey (season 13)